Bathilde is a Germanic given name, with variants as Bathilda, Balthild, Bathildis' or Böðvildr. It may refer to:

Persons 
Böðvildr, Germanic legendary character
Balthild of Chelles (626–680), Merovingian queen
Bathilde d'Orléans (1750–1822), French princess
Bathilda Bagshot, fictional character from the Harry Potter universe
Bathilde (character), fictional character from the ballet Giselle
Princess Bathildis of Anhalt-Dessau, wife of Prince William of Schaumburg-Lippe
Princess Bathildis of Schaumburg-Lippe, consort of Friedrich, Prince of Waldeck and Prymont, daughter of the above

Animals 
Bathilda, a genus of birds